Hampshire is a county in England. It may also refer to:

States and provinces
New Hampshire, United States

Counties
Hampshire County, Massachusetts, United States
Hampshire County, West Virginia, United States
Hampshire County, Quebec, a former division in Lower Canada
Hampshire (non-metropolitan county), England, United Kingdom

Cities, towns, and villages
Hampshire, Prince Edward Island, Canada
Hampshire, Illinois, United States
Hampshire, Tasmania, a locality in Australia
Hampshire, Tennessee, United States
Hampshire, West Virginia, United States

Colleges
Hampshire College, Amherst, Massachusetts

Park
 Hampshire Park, Kuala Lumpur City Centre

People 
 Emily Hampshire (born 1979), Canadian actress
 John Hampshire (cricketer, born 1913)
 John Hampshire, International cricketer and umpire
Susan Hampshire (born 1937), English actress

Animals
Hampshire (pig) 
Hampshire (sheep)

Ships
 , a British Royal Navy ship
 , operated by the Hudson's Bay Company in 1697, see Hudson's Bay Company vessels

Buildings
Hampshire Garden Apartment Buildings, listed on the National Register of Historic Places in Washington, D.C.

See also